Jam Airport  is an airport serving Jam and nearby Bandar Kangan in Iran.

Airports in Iran
Buildings and structures in Bushehr Province
Transportation in Bushehr Province